McEvers Island is an uninhabited fluvial island in the Illinois River.  Approximately 1 mile (1.6 km) long, it is legally part of Montezuma Township within Pike County in the U.S. state of Illinois.  The island, at Mile 48.5, is often used as a landmark by commercial and pleasure boaters traversing the river.  Boaters often anchor or tie up in the narrow, sheltered channel east of the island, bordering the Scott County Illinois mainland.

References

Illinois River
Landforms of Pike County, Illinois
River islands of Illinois
Uninhabited islands of the United States